Lucas Nahuel González Martínez (born 3 June 2000) is an Argentine professional footballer who plays as a midfielder for Independiente.

Career
González started his career with Gimnasia y Esgrima, before leaving in 2009 to join Argentinos Juniors where he remained until 2015 after penning terms with Independiente. His breakthrough campaign came in 2019–20, with the midfielder making his senior debut in a Copa Sudamericana round of sixteen home win over Ecuadorian club Universidad Católica. His bow in the Primera División didn't arrive until 1 February 2020, as he was substituted on for the final twelve minutes of a 5–0 win over Rosario Central; his first start occurred a month later against Central Córdoba.

Personal life
González is the son of former professional footballer Alejandro González.

Career statistics

Notes

References

External links

2000 births
Living people
Sportspeople from Jujuy Province
Argentine footballers
Association football midfielders
Club Atlético Independiente footballers